Puja Gupta is an Indian model and actress. She is a former Miss India Universe, a title she won in 2007.

Life and career
Gupta was born in New Delhi, India. Her modeling breakthrough came in 2007 when she won the title of Miss India Universe.
She represented India at the 2007 Miss Universe competition in Mexico, where she made the top ten. Following this she became the marketing face for a number of brands and labels.

She made her acting debut in the film F.A.L.T.U. In 2013, she appeared in the film Go Goa Gone and Shortcut Romeo. As at 2018 she has eight acting credits, according to IMDb.

Gupta is a supporter of the animal rights organization PETA.

Personal life
Puja is married to investment banker Varun Talukdar.

Filmography

References

External links

 
 

Living people
Year of birth missing (living people)
Actresses from New Delhi
Female models from Delhi
Femina Miss India winners
Indian film actresses
Actresses in Hindi cinema
Miss Universe 2007 contestants
21st-century Indian actresses